Anthony Vincent "Bunny" Brief (born Anthony John Grzeszkowski; July 3, 1892 – February 11, 1963) was a baseball first baseman who spent his first three seasons of professional baseball with the Class D Traverse City Resorters of the Michigan State League, before advancing to Major League Baseball with the St. Louis Browns (1912–13), Chicago White Sox (1915), and Pittsburgh Pirates (1917). Born in Remus, Michigan, Brief played in 184 Major League games and had a lifetime batting average of .223 and a .306 on-base percentage. He was of Polish descent.

After his Major League career ended, Brief continued to play in the minor leagues until 1928. Though he never hit more than two home runs in any of his Major League seasons, Brief holds the all-time record for home runs in the American Association with 256. His eight minor league home run crowns are tied for the most ever, with Ken Guettler. He won home run crowns in: 1911 – Michigan State League (10); 1912 – Michigan State League (13); 1916 – Pacific Coast League (33); 1920 – American Association (23); 1921 – American Association (42); 1922 – American Association (40); 1925 – American Association (37) and 1926 – American Association (26).

In 1921, Brief had a remarkable season for the Kansas City Blues of the American Association with 42 home runs, 191 RBIs, and 166 runs scored.

Brief died in 1963 at age 70 in Milwaukee, Wisconsin.

References

External links

 BaseballLibrary.com
 American Association Almanac

Baseball players from Michigan
Chicago White Sox players
Major League Baseball first basemen
St. Louis Browns players
Pittsburgh Pirates players
1892 births
1963 deaths
Traverse City Resorters players
Kansas City Blues (baseball) players
Salt Lake City Bees players
Louisville Colonels (minor league) players
Milwaukee Brewers (minor league) players
Minor league baseball managers